Acalolepta pleuralis is a species of beetle in the family Cerambycidae. It was described by Bernhard Schwarzer in 1930. It is known from Indonesia.

References

Acalolepta
Beetles described in 1930